Kuo Dai-chi (born 16 December 1981), Amis name Kanas Kociang, is a Taiwanese baseball player who currently plays for Uni-President Lions of Chinese Professional Baseball League. He currently plays as a right fielder for the Lions.

He underwent Tommy John surgery on his right arm, and was forced to miss the first few weeks of the season.

See also
Chinese Professional Baseball League
Uni-President Lions

References

1981 births
2009 World Baseball Classic players
Living people
People from Taitung County
Uni-President 7-Eleven Lions players